Gogri Jamalpur is a notified area in the Khagaria district in the Indian state of Bihar. It is located in northwestern India about 25 kilometers north of the Ganges River.

Demographics
According to the 2011 India census, Gogri Jamalpur has a population of 37,753. Males constitute 53% of the population and females 47%. The gender ratio is 896, i.e. for every 1000 males there are 896 females. Sixty-seven percent of the population is literate, just one percent lower than neighboring Khagaria.

References

Cities and towns in Khagaria district